Force is a series of Indian action-thriller films, produced by Vipul Amrutlal Shah. The first part directed by Nishikant Kamath released in 2011 and the second part directed by Abhinay Deo released in 2016. A third part of the series is in pre-production.

Overview

Force (2011)

ACP Yashvardhan Singh. IPS (John Abraham) a.k.a. Yash, is in the hospital, recalling the accident that changed his life forever. Yash is a dutiful, responsible and stone-hearted police officer in the Narcotics Control Bureau whose only passion in life is crime-fighting. He has no family or loved ones and has been alone in life since he can remember. Everything changes when Yash meets Maya (Genelia D'Souza), an independent and lovely woman. Though the two get off to a rocky start, Maya warms up to him once she realises he is a police officer, and apologises for the misunderstandings they had. When Maya gets hit by a car in front of Yash, he rushes her to the hospital. The two bond and start to meet and go out regularly. Maya confesses her love to Yash, but Yash refutes her advances, as he does not want her to become his weakness in his professional life. However, Swati (Sandhya Mridul), the wife of Yash's coworker and good friend, convinces Yash that he is in love with Maya as well and Yash decides to marry her.

In the big drug case the unit is investigating, Yash, along with officers from the Narcotics Control Bureau, DSP Mahesh Pande (Ameet M Gaur) who is transferred on special duty from the New Delhi Income Tax Department, DSP Atul Kalseka (Mohnish Bahl) and Inspector Kamlesh, kills Reddy (Mukesh Rishi) while he is peddling drugs. Yash, Mahesh and Kamlesh are suspended for killing Reddy instead of arresting him. Reddy's heartless and aggressive brother Vishnu (Vidyut Jamwal) vows to avenge his brother's death by killing all of the officers. Yash and the other officers prepare themselves for Vishnu, but Vishnu successfully breaks into Mahesh's home and brutally murders him after raping his wife Rachana (Anaitha Nair). The event leaves Yash and the other officers shaken but Yash and Maya's marriage take place. Meanwhile, Vishnu decides to attack each of the officers' weaknesses; he kidnaps Swati, Atul's wife, and Atul is forced to tell him where Yash will be that night. Yash and Maya consummate their marriage; however, this proves to be their first and last night together.

Yash is shot and Maya is kidnapped in the attack. Yash miraculously survives the attack. Vishnu tells Atul that he will release Swati if Atul kills Yash. However, Atul cannot bring himself to kill his friend and instead joins forces with Yash to execute a plan against Vishnu and save Maya and Swati. Yash, Atul and Kamlesh all go to the place where Vishnu has been keeping Maya and Swati hostage and find, in horror, that Swati has been murdered. In despair and heartbreak, Atul kills himself after seeing Swati's body. Yash and Kamlesh go together and face Vishnu in a final confrontation. Kamlesh is shot but survives. Vishnu shoots Maya in front of Yash and drops her from the second floor. Yash catches her but is unable to save her. Maya assures Yash that she has gotten her wish of being with him and dies in Yash's arms. Anger and sorrow build up in Yash and he brutally finishes off Vishnu, exacting his revenge.

Yash is shown living alone again, having returned to his professional life. Kamlesh calls Yash and tells him that he has found a new informer. Yash turns to Maya's photo before leaving and says that he will be coming home late.

Force 2 (2016)

ACP Yashvardhan Singh ( John Abraham) is a no non-sense police officer who still has a passion of crime fighting despite to losing his wife, Maya (Genelia D'Souza) five years ago and having her hallucination in present. He soon receives a news of murder of three R.A.W. agents, one of them was his best friend Harish.

Yash suddenly receives the clue from Harish before dying, the clue indicates that someone like a "SPY" working in Budapest embassy is planning to destroy R.A.W. team. Yash updates the information to Intelligence bureau director and R.A.W. head Anjan. Anjan suggest Yash to team-up with eastern European in-charge Kamaljeet Kaur (Sonakshi Sinha) to go Budapest. Yash and KK reach to safe house in Budapest but suddenly they escape a blast, at this process he tells her about the same clue (means someone from Budapest embassy is leaking information and location of RAW agents).

Yash and KK shift to hotel to find more about embassy employees, she finds three suspects from database while he investigates alone with five employees who were included in database and they have party in club. Yash gets fourth suspect in whom he believes to be real culprit as KK does not believe. The fourth suspect is revealed to be Shiv Sharma (Tahir Raj Bhasin), a mastermind terrorist who has a mission to destroy RAW by providing locations and informations of RAW agents to his Chinese spies. Yash and KK decides to lure anyone in glass art museum by giving fake mail for Chinese spy recruitment. Shiv decodes the location and reaches with first suspect. After some investigation KK realizes that Yash was right, Yash goes to Shiv's home to track him down but Shiv later runs away, KK tries to catch Shiv but gets knocked by him. They arrest Shiv after a chase and decides to bring him to India at any cost. In every attempt they have to fight Shiv's men. They have failed to save another RAW agent in train station underground. In final attempt Shiv gets shot and gets rushed to hospital. Yash later learns that Shiv is alive then gets taunted and hinted by him. Yash checks KK's watch and realizes that tracking chip was placed in it when she was knocked.

Yash and KK take help from club dancer Martinez, who is used to help her. He suspects Martinez that she might not help him but in order to get Shiv's location he accepts offer for having one night stand with her. After having location Yash and KK finds Shiv's hideout but in chase they have failed to catch Shiv. Shiv then shifts another location and kills two more RAW agents. Yash's suspection turns true when Martinez is revealed to be working for Shiv.

After having another location Yash goes to another Hideout to collect a clue, a clue indicates a real birth date of Shiv. He learns from his colleague living in Mumbai that Shiv was dead ten years ago and realizes that it was his fake identity. Yash sends whole intelligence bureau team to orphanage at where Shiv was raised and learns that Shiv's real name is Rudra Pratap Singh, a son of former RAW agent Karan Pratap Singh who has been working for RAW from 30 years, he was disowned by Cabinet minister Brijesh Yadav and was killed, Rudra's mother has also committed suicide in this shock, at this process Yash realizes that Rudra wanted revenge not from RAW but from Brijesh. Yash declines from going to Berlin when his suspection was right and goes for Indo-Hungarian summit meeting to hunt down Rudra.

In summit KK is now able to shoot Brijesh but leaves him alive, Yash then defeats all Rudra's men. Rudra kills all men guarding Brijesh but gets stopped by KK before shooting Brijesh dead, Rudra tells his real identity to Brijesh and his plan to kill total 17 RAW agents in Hong Kong. Yash confronts and shoots Rudra, Yash then forces Brijesh in the process to remove negative label from all RAW agents and Rudra dies. Brijesh completes the work and gets interviewed. Maya's vision tells Yash that KK is his better love then her. This film ends with Yash and KK reunited together happily and watching Brijesh in news. This message shows unsung heroes or RAW agents who died to save India.

Cast and characters

Release and revenue

Game
An official game based on Force 2 has been launched after the release of the film by Hungama Digital Media.

Music

Track listing of Force

Track listing of Force 2

See also
 Kaakha Kaakha, 2003 Tamil film, on which Force based on.

References

External links
 
 

 
 

2010s Hindi-language films
Indian film series
Action film series
Fox Star Studios films
Viacom18 Studios films